Ásmundur Friðriksson (born 21 January 1956) is an Icelandic politician. He has been a member of Alþingi for the Independence Party since 2013.

References

External links
Bio at Alþingi

1956 births
Living people
Asmundur Fridriksson
Asmundur Fridriksson
Asmundur Fridriksson